Benjamin Bayley (1 December 1874 – 16 March 1924) was a cricketer from British Guiana. He played in five first-class matches for British Guiana from 1896 to 1912.

See also
 List of Guyanese representative cricketers

References

External links
 

1874 births
1924 deaths
Cricketers from British Guiana
Sportspeople from Georgetown, Guyana